Shira is a railway station      of the Abakan region of the Krasnoyarsk Railway on the line crossing  between Achinsk  Krasnoyarsk Krai  ( on the main course of the Trans–Siberian Railway) and Tigey  Khakassia (   railway junction with the South Siberian Railway). 

It is located in the village of Shira, the administrative center of the Shirinsky district of the Republic of Khakassia.

History 
Shira railway station was founded in 1916 on the Achinsk - Minusinsk railway line, part of the Siberian Railway. 

The settlement at Shira was established that year during the construction of the railway line, and in 1917 consisted of 57 people. 

The first train arrived at the station on 15 December 1924. There is a one-story station building. 

The station became part of the Krasnoyarsk Railway in 1936, which lasted until the railway's abolition in 1961 and its merger into the East Siberian Railway. In 1979 a new Krasnoyarsk Railway was formed from the East Siberian Railway, and in 2003 the railway and Shira station became part of Russian Railways.

The station is served by long-distance trains between Moscow and Abakan, though not by commuter services. Trains stop for 10 minutes at the station.

Long distance station

References 

Railway stations in Russia opened in 1916
Rail transport in Khakassia
Rail transport in Siberia